Eagle Creek Upper Falls, also called Upper Eagle Creek Falls, is a small waterfall located in Clackamas County, in the U.S. state of Oregon. The waterfall is known for a fish ladder that bypasses the waterfall to assist fish navigate the waterfall. Eagle Creek is known for being a point for fishing chinook salmon, bull trout, and steelhead trout.

Upper Eagle Creek Falls is located upstream from the Eagle Creek National Fish Hatchery, a popular spot to start kayaking downstream Eagle Creek.

Common waterfalls along the Eagle Creek Trail are listed below, including the popular Tunnel Falls.

Fires 
On September 2, 2017, a wildfire started in Eagle Creek, affecting 45% of its forest, mainly the surface level. Before this there had never been a major fire affecting Eagle Creek land. Fortunately, the trails and campground were not disturbed. With the Eagle Creek fire on the news in September, the creek had more attention and exposure drawn to it, which may increase the number of visitors.

The Eagle Creek Fire is an ongoing wildfire in the Columbia River Gorge in the U.S. states of Oregon and Washington. The fire was started on September 2, 2017, reportedly caused by teenagers igniting fireworks during a burn ban. As of November 9, 2017, the fire had consumed 48,831 acres (19,761 ha) and was 50% contained. Fire growth was slowed by rain. In mid-September, highway closures and local evacuations were gradually being lifted. On November 30, 2017, the fire was declared fully contained but not yet completely out.

With the fire closing I-84, for safety reasons loggers took down over 4,000, which ODOT (Oregon Department of Transportation) donated to the U.S. Forest Service to complete habitat and restoration projects. The fire affected private, state and national land.

Activities and general area 
The Eagle Creek Park campground can hold 90 visitors and was made around 1930 by the Civilian Conservation Corps. From there, visitors can go kayaking in the creek, and hike to several falls such as Tunnel and Punch Bowl falls. From many points along the Eagle Creek Trail and the included waterfalls, the Cascade Mountain Range and the Columbia River Gorge are visible.

The Eagle Creek trail-head is a busy place most weekends. Here sits the jump-off point for a half-dozen trails. In addition to Eagle Creek hikers, it accommodates PCT thru-hikers, locals who enjoy the day-use picnic area, site-seers enjoying the nearby fish hatcheries, and campers at nearby Eagle Creek Campground.

The Eagle Creek trail-head has recently seen a great number of break-ins to cars. Thieves are known to frequent this area and work quickly. They tend to go for the obvious (valuables left in cars) but also for identity information left in glove compartments. It is an attractive area for thieves because of its proximity to the interstate on-ramp.

In addition, hikers have even reported losing backpacks left at the trail-head momentarily while fetching their vehicle.

Many hikers have taken to bringing all their valuables with them, leaving the doors to their car unlocked and the glove compartments open.

There are signs posted that recommend you park at the lower parking area that you first pass by when you drive in from the freeway, next to the fish hatchery (where there are people 24/7, a window looks out onto the parking area) and during the summer there is a camp host. Parking here will add about a 1/2 mile to your hike.

History 
The nonprofit Eagle Creek Park Foundation provides financial and volunteer assistance for the park, which was founded around 1910.
Eagle Creek was created around 1930 by the Civilian Conservation Corps to be included in the Pacific Crest Trail. J.K. Lilly Jr. was the first to buy a piece of land that will be later called Eagle Creek Park in 1934. During the 1950s, she donated her Eagle Crest Estate, Eagle Valley Farms and East Crest Forest to Purdue University, which sold land to Marion County. Since Lilly was the first to buy, the park established a library in her honor within the Eagle Creek Park Nature Center in 1973. Five years later the Eagle Creek Park Foundation was established with a slim nine members.

The Park Foundation provides park maps and daily and annual passes. It costs $1.50 to walk or bike through, and $5.00 to enter the park with a vehicle. To encourage seniors to enjoy the park, they don't need to pay for daily admission. The Foundation encourages outdoor learning and it monetarily supported the Ornithology Center with $4,500 and held an outdoor bird game for children.

Trail 
The Eagle Creek trail was completed in 1983 and renovated in 1998. Currently, the trail is not able to be visited. Due to Eagle Creek Fire, most National Forest System lands in the Columbia River Gorge National Scenic Area south of the Columbia River, east of Sandy River Delta, north of the National Scenic Area boundary, and west of Hood River have a legal closure in effect until further notice. More information can be found on the site USDA Forest Service Website.

Eagle Creek is a creek in Hood River County, Oregon, United States. The creek drains into the Columbia River in Multnomah County, with its outlet on the Columbia River Gorge. It is in the Mount Hood National Forest. The Eagle Creek Trail – the most popular trail in the Gorge – follows the creek.

Tunnel Falls and Punch Bowl Falls, located on Eagle Creek, are remote and scenic waterfalls along the creek. The Historic Columbia River Highway crosses the creek's outlet to the Columbia River. A substantial hike through some occasionally rough terrain is required to get to the creek's namesake waterfall.

Eagle Creek Trail was built by the CCC and WPA in the 1930s for the Pacific Crest Trail, probably to cross the Columbia River at Bonneville Dam. The PCT was rerouted to its current route some 1.5 miles (2.4 km) further east sometime by the early 1970s to connect with the Bridge of the Gods across the Columbia River. Additional parking is available beside Cascade Fish Hatchery, located off exit 41 of eastbound Interstate 84 at the start of Eagle Creek Lane.

See also 
 List of rivers of Oregon
 List of waterfalls in Oregon
 Punch Bowl Falls
 Twister Falls

References

External links
 Calipopo - Mapping application of the area (commonly used for canyoneering)
 Rope Wiki
 USGS - Geological Survey
 OregonHikers.org

Waterfalls of Clackamas County, Oregon